Kansua is a small genus of bush crickets or katydids in the tribe Drymadusini.  Species are found in northern China.

Species
The Orthoptera Species File includes:

Kansua diebua Liu, 2015
Kansua hummeli Uvarov, 1933 - type species

References

Tettigoniinae
Orthoptera of Asia
Ensifera genera